Ženklava is a municipality and village in Nový Jičín District in the Moravian-Silesian Region of the Czech Republic. It has about 1,100 inhabitants.

Notable people
Christian David (1692–1751), German Lutheran missionary, writer and hymnwriter

References

Villages in Nový Jičín District